Kaarlo Olavi Leinonen (15 March 1914 – 19 April 1975) was a Finnish general and Minister of Defence from December 1963 to September 1964. He was the Chief of Defence of the Finnish Defence Forces between 1969 and 1974. Leinonen was born in Tervola. He died in Karjalohja.

References

1914 births
1975 deaths
People from Tervola
People from Oulu Province (Grand Duchy of Finland)
Chiefs of Staff (Finnish Defence Forces)
Ministers of Defence of Finland
Finnish generals
Finnish military personnel of World War II